Raphaël Coleman (30 September 1994 – 6 February 2020) was an English climate change activist and former actor.

Early life
Raphäel Coleman was born in Wandsworth, England in September 1994.

Career
As a child, Coleman acted in several films and was best known for his role as Eric Brown in Nanny McPhee. He subsequently gave up acting, took the name James "Iggy" Fox, and became a climate change activist involved with the group Extinction Rebellion. He wrote that he became an environmental activist after seven years studying towards his M.Sc. degree in zoology.

Death
Coleman died on 6 February 2020 at the age of 25, after collapsing from a heart failure while out jogging.

Filmography

Awards and nominations

References

External links
 http://www.formatcourt.com/2010/05/13th-brussels-short-film-festival-le-palmares/

1994 births
2020 deaths
English male child actors
English male film actors
Male actors from London
Place of death missing
Climate activists
21st-century English male actors